The M60 recoilless gun is an 82-mm antitank recoilless gun developed in the former Yugoslavia. It entered service with the Yugoslav People's Army in the 1960s.

Description
The M60 is mounted on a towing carriage with wheels for transport and firing.  Aiming is done with an optical sight.  Ammunition for the M60 includes two fin-stabilized high-explosive anti-tank (HEAT) rounds. The first HEAT projectile for the M60 had an effective range of 500 meters. The second was an improved version that used a rocket booster to increase the effective range to 1,000 meters.

The maximum range of the piece is 4,700 meters. Direct fire is limited to 1,500 meters against stationary targets and 1,000 meters against moving targets. The M60 is credited with a 220mm penetration of armor with its HEAT round.

Users
: It was used by the Yugoslav People's Army.

: produced as BT-82.

: It is being used in the Syrian Civil War.

References

Notes

Bibliography
 (JIW) Hogg, Ian.  Jane's Infantry Weapons 1984-85, London: Jane's Publishing Company Ltd., 1984.
 (WEG) U.S. Army. Worldwide Equipment Guide 2001, Training and Doctrine Command, 2001.

Recoilless rifles
Anti-tank weapons
Weapons of Yugoslavia
82 mm artillery
Military equipment introduced in the 1960s